Basque pelota at the 2011 Pan American Games in Guadalajara, were held over a six-day period from October 21 to October 27. The events took place at the Basque Pelota Complex in Guadalajara.

Medal summary

Medal table

Men's events

Women's events

Qualification
The top five nations in each event (top ten for the Paleta Leather Pairs 30m Fronton) at the 2010 World Championships in Pau, France qualified for the Pan American Games.

References

Events at the 2011 Pan American Games
2011
2011 Pan American Games
Basque pelota competitions in Mexico